The Central District of Fuman County is a district (bakhsh) in Fuman County, Gilan Province, Iran. At the 2006 census, its population was 81,449, in 21,913 families.  The District has one city: Fuman. The District has four rural districts (dehestan): Gasht Rural District, Gurab Pas Rural District, Lulaman Rural District, and Rud Pish Rural District.

References 

Fuman County
Districts of Gilan Province